Galanthus plicatus, the pleated snowdrop, is a species of flowering plant in the family Amaryllidaceae, native to eastern Europe and western Asia. It is a spring flowering bulbous herbaceous perennial.

Description
The leaf edges are folded back away from the upper surface of the leaf, both in bud and after they expand. The nodding white flowers appear in very early spring, and are among the very first plants to flower. They have six white tepals. In G. plicatus subsp. byzantinus, the inner tepals also have a green mark at the base.

Taxonomy
Galanthus plicatus was first described by the German biologist Friedrich Marschall von Bieberstein in 1819. In 1893, Baker described Galanthus byzantinus from north-western Turkey as a separate species, differing in possessing green marks at the base as well as the tip of the inner three tepals. It is now usually treated as a subspecies of G. plicatus.

Subspecies
Two subspecies are recognized:
Galanthus plicatus subsp. byzantinus (Baker) D.A.Webb – north-west Turkey
Galanthus plicatus subsp. plicatus – throughout the range of the species

Distribution and habitat
Galanthus plicatus occurs from eastern Europe (Romania, Ukraine and Crimea) through Turkey to the north-west Caucasus. G. plicatus subsp. plicatus is found throughout the range of the species, G. plicatus subsp. byzantinus only in north-west Turkey.  The species is found in woodland and scrub, usually in shade.

Cultivation
Galanthus plicatus and the cultivar 'Three Ships'  are both recipients of the Royal Horticultural Society's Award of Garden Merit. The cultivar 'Wendy's Gold' has a yellow ovary and yellow markings on the inner tepals.

References

Amaryllidoideae
Flora of Romania
Flora of the Crimean Peninsula
Flora of Ukraine
Flora of the Caucasus
Flora of Turkey
Plants described in 1819